The Copa América is South America's major tournament in senior men's soccer and determines the continental champion. Until 1967, the tournament was known as South American Championship. It is the oldest continental championship in the world.

Costa Rica are not members of the South American football confederation CONMEBOL. But because CONMEBOL only has ten member associations, guest nations have regularly been invited since 1993. Costa Rica have competed in the Copa América five times, and reached the quarter-finals twice.

On four occasions, they have been directly invited. The Copa América Centenario in 2016 was a collaboration of the CONCACAF and the CONMEBOL and Costa Rica qualified by virtue of winning the 2014 Copa Centroamericana.

In their home confederation, the North American CONCACAF, Costa Rica have won three titles (1963, 1969 and 1989).

Record at the Copa América

* Draws include matches decided on penalties.

Match Overview

Match Overview

Squads

Record Players

Top Goalscorers

References

External links
RSSSF archives and results
Soccerway database

Countries at the Copa América
Costa Rica national football team